Talika (also Romanized as Talīkā) is a village in Khvosh Rud Rural District, Bandpey-ye Gharbi District, Babol County, Mazandaran Province, Iran. At the 2006 census, its population was 134, in 32 families.

References 

Populated places in Babol County